"Hell Is the Absence of God" is a 2001 fantasy novelette by American writer Ted Chiang, first published in , and subsequently 
reprinted in Year's Best Fantasy 2, and in Fantasy: The Best of 2001, as well as in Chiang's 2002 anthology, Stories of Your Life and Others.

"Hell Is" won the 2002 Hugo Award for Best Novelette, the Nebula Award for Best Novelette, and the Locus Award for Best Novelette. It was also a finalist for the 2002 Theodore Sturgeon Award. The novelette has also been translated into Japanese, Italian, Spanish, French, Russian, German, Ukrainian and Romanian.

Plot

The story is set in a world where the existence of God, souls, Heaven, and Hell are obvious and indisputable, and where miracles and angelic visitations are commonplace—albeit not necessarily benevolent. The story focuses primarily on Neil Fisk, a widower whose wife, Sarah, is killed by the collateral damage of an angel's visitation. Sarah's soul was seen ascending to Heaven, leading the non-devout Neil to desperately seek the love and devotion needed to please God and enter Heaven to reunite with Sarah.

The story also follows Janice Reilly, a woman born without legs who is made able-bodied in an angelic visitation. Janice, a motivational and spiritual speaker, is met with a lukewarm response during a meeting after her visitation when she suggests that her gift is a test of her devotion to God rather than a blessing. This greatly angers Neil, who was present.

The reader is then introduced to Ethan Mead, who cannot discern the meaning of an angelic encounter he experienced. This begins to take a toll on his marriage, but Ethan desperately seeks help with his predicament. He eventually meets Janice, who has decided to organize a pilgrimage to one of the few holy sites on Earth where visitations are frequent. Wanting to return her blessing, her story makes the news, convincing Neil that the only way to enter Heaven is by witnessing Heaven's light.

In the past, many people who have witnessed Heaven's light, which appears when an angel enters and exits the mortal world, ascend to Heaven no matter the amount or severity of their sins. Sure enough, an angel appears and flies over the holy site. The many pilgrims present desperately attempt to witness Heaven's light by following the angel. Neil is following in a truck but crashes and is left mortally wounded. Janice and Ethan attempt to help him, but as the angel leaves Earth, Heaven's light strikes Neil and Janice.

Both are left blind and Neil dies. Much to Ethan's shock, he witnesses Neil's soul descend to Hell. Janice goes on a speaking tour where she describes her experience and the beauty of Heaven. Ethan becomes a minister after deciding that the purpose of his first visitation was to lead him to meet Neil and reveal to the world that exposure to Heaven's light does not guarantee entrance into Heaven.

In Hell, Neil, having finally gained the love and devotion to God that he desperately sought, accepts that he will never reunite with Sarah and will spend eternity in the absence of God.

Background
Commenting on "Hell Is the Absence of God" in the "Story Notes" section of Stories of Your Life and Others, Chiang said that after seeing the film The Prophecy, he wanted to write a story about angels, but could not think of a scenario that would work. It was only when he started imagining angels as being "phenomena of terrifying power, whose visitations resembled natural disasters" that he was able to proceed. Chiang wrote that the Book of Job also contributed to ideas for his story, as it raised the question: why did God restore Job to prosperity when the Book's lesson was that "virtue isn't always rewarded"?

In interviews Chiang has explicitly stated that "Hell Is the Absence of God" is "straight fantasy", because it takes place in a universe "in which the scientific method doesn't work". He said it is about "innocent suffering", and the way people devoted to God deal with it. He also said that the novelette examines the role of faith in religion, and suggests that if God undeniably existed, then faith would no longer be applicable.

Reception
Robert J. Sawyer and David G. Hartwell described "Hell Is the Absence of God" as the "best single SF story of 2002". Conversely, John C. Wright called it "trite antichristian propaganda". Elf Sternberg has compared the novelette to C. S. Lewis's The Great Divorce, saying that although Lewis is a supporter of God, Chiang is "far more ambivalent".

In a review of Chiang's Stories of Your Life and Others in The Guardian, English fantasy author China Miéville called "Hell Is the Absence of God" the showpiece of Chiang's collection. He wrote that despite the story's religious underpinnings, there is no "moralistic Sturm und Drang, and Chiang "does not descend to the finger-wagging one might expect from a liberal intellectual".

Ken Liu wrote "Single-Bit Error", a short story published in 2009, in response to "Hell Is the Absence of God".

Awards

Publication history

Source: Internet Speculative Fiction Database

References

Works cited

External links 

2001 short stories
American short stories
Novelettes
Novels about religion
Fantasy short stories
Hugo Award for Best Novelette winning works
Nebula Award for Best Novelette-winning works
Short stories by Ted Chiang
Books about angels
Heaven in popular culture
Hell in popular culture
Fiction about God